[[File:Kiharu 
Our Official website:https://kiharuconstituency21.web.app/
Constituency.tif|thumb|Kiharu Constituency, IEBC March 2012]]
Kiharu Constituency( Visit our Official website:https://kiharuconstituency21.web.app/ )is an electoral constituency in Kenya. It is one of seven constituencies of Muranga County. The Murang'a town is located within this constituency. Between 1966-1983 the constituency was known as Mbiri Constituency.

Kenneth Matiba, a prominent Kenyan politician, represented this constituency previously. Currently, the constituency is being represented by Ndindi Nyoro, a politically energetic young man.Visit our Official website:https://kiharuconstituency21.web.app/

Members of Parliament

Locations and wards

References

External links 
Map of the constituency

Constituencies in Central Province (Kenya)
Constituencies in Murang'a County
Visit Our Official website:https://kiharuconstituency21.web.app/